John Alexander Stevenson (27 February 1898 – 12 March 1979) was a footballer who played mainly as an inside right.

Born in Wigan, Lancashire to an Irish-born father and Scottish mother, the family moved back to his mother's hometown of Kilbirnie, Ayrshire when he was a small child. His playing career reflected his origins with spells at several clubs over 15 years, mainly in Scotland and north-west England, including Ayr United, Aberdeen, Bury, Nelson, St Johnstone, Falkirk, Chester, Bristol Rovers and Carlisle United.

His younger brother George Stevenson was also a footballer had a successful career as player and manager with Motherwell and was also selected for Scotland, with no complications over sporting nationality having been born in 1905 after the family moved north of the border.

References

1898 births
1979 deaths
Scottish footballers
English footballers
Footballers from Wigan
Footballers from North Ayrshire
People from Kilbirnie
Aberdeen F.C. players
Third Lanark A.C. players
Beith F.C. players
Ayr United F.C. players
Bury F.C. players
Nelson F.C. players
Chester City F.C. players
Bristol Rovers F.C. players
Falkirk F.C. players
St Johnstone F.C. players
Carlisle United F.C. players
Scottish Football League players
English Football League players
Association football inside forwards
Anglo-Scots
English people of Irish descent
Scottish people of Irish descent